Eagle Township, Ohio, may refer to:

Eagle Township, Brown County, Ohio
Eagle Township, Hancock County, Ohio
Eagle Township, Vinton County, Ohio

Ohio township disambiguation pages